Lehmkuhlen is a municipality in the district of Plön, in Schleswig-Holstein, Germany.

Points of interest
 Arboretum Lehmkuhlen

References

Municipalities in Schleswig-Holstein
Plön (district)